St John's Church is in St John's Road, Birkdale, Southport, Merseyside, England. It is an active Anglican parish church in the deanery of North Meols, the archdeaconry of Warrington, and the diocese of Liverpool. The church is recorded in the National Heritage List for England as a designated Grade II listed building.

History

St John's was built in 1889–90, and designed by the Lancaster architects Paley, Austin and Paley. The church cost £3,000 (equivalent to £ in ), and provided seating for 318 people.  It was enlarged in 1909–10 by Austin and Paley who added a north aisle with an arcade, and vestries. This cost £2,000 and added 186 seats.

Architecture

Exterior
The church is constructed in brick, with dressings in glazed brick and terracotta, and some timber framing. The roofs have red tiles, and the bellcote has a spirelet clad with green Westmorland slate.  The architectural style is Arts and Crafts with some Perpendicular details. The plan of the church consists of a nave with north and south aisles, a south porch, a chancel with a chapel to the south and a north vestry, and a bellcote at the west end. The aisles embrace double transepts. On the south side is a timber-framed porch with a square three-light window to its right. The transepts have a central buttress, with a tall, three-stage, two-light window on each side of it. On the west side of the transepts, and in the apexes of the gables, is timber studwork. In the south wall of the chapel is a square three-light window. The west window has six lights, and the east window, five lights; These windows are in Decorated style, with terracotta mullions, and sandstone tracery.  The bellcote contains two-light windows, surmounted by a broach spire, with a metal finial.

Interior
Inside the church the brickwork is exposed, The arcades are carried on Perpendicular-style red sandstone piers without capitals springing into brick arches. The authors of the Buildings of England series consider that the stained glass in the east window is by Barrowclough and Sanders, and that elsewhere there are windows by Abbott and Company, and by Shrigley and Hunt.  The three-manual organ was built in about 1893 by Rushworth and Dreaper of Liverpool.

See also

 Listed buildings in Birkdale
 List of works by Paley, Austin and Paley
 List of ecclesiastical works by Austin and Paley (1895–1914)

References

Bibliography

Church of England church buildings in Merseyside
Grade II listed churches in Merseyside
Saint Johns Church, Birkdale
Saint Johns Church, Birkdale
Gothic Revival church buildings in England
Gothic Revival architecture in Merseyside
Anglican Diocese of Liverpool
Paley, Austin and Paley buildings
Austin and Paley buildings
Buildings and structures in Southport
Conservative evangelical Anglican churches in England